Chen Shiyi (born 1956) is a Chinese mechanical engineer and physicist. He is the President of South University of Science and Technology of China.

Previously, he was the Alonzo G. Decker Jr. Chair in Engineering and Science, the Department Chair of Mechanical Engineering and Professor at both Department of Applied Mathematics and Statistics, and Department of Physics and Astronomy of Johns Hopkins University. He was also the Dean of the College of Engineering and the Director of the Center for Computational Science & Engineering, Peking University.

Career
Chen studied mechanics at Zhejiang University (B.Sc) from January 1978 to January 1982. He did his postgraduate study (M.Sc, PhD) at Peking University.

He was a post-doctoral fellow at Los Alamos National Laboratory USA from June 1987 to February 1990. From February 1990 to December 1990, he was a research scientist at the Bartol Research Institute, University of Delaware. From May 1990 till December 1993, he was a visiting faculty in the Department of Mathematics, Colorado State University. From December 1990 - November 1992, he was an Oppenheimer Fellow at the Los Alamos National Laboratory. November 1992 - September 1994, he was a research staff and group leader in the same lab. September 1994 - January 2000, he was a research staff member at the IBM Research Division. Then he started his career at the Johns Hopkins University. July 1997 - January 2000, he was also the Deputy Director of the Center for Nonlinear Studies, Los Alamos National Laboratory. From 2005-2011, he became Dean of Engineering at Peking University, China. From 2013-2015, he became VP for Research at Peking University. In 2015, he joined SUSTech, China, as university President.

Chen conducted research in lattice gas methods in which he created important analysis approaches and led engineering applications. He also made contributions to high-performance computing. He did fundamental studies in the theory of turbulence. For these reasons, he was elected as a fellow of American Physical Society (1995) and Institute of Physics (2004).

He was elected to member of Chinese Academy of Sciences in 2013.

References

External links

1956 births
Living people
Chinese expatriates in the United States
Chinese mechanical engineers
Colorado State University faculty
Educators from Taizhou, Zhejiang
Fellows of the American Physical Society
Fellows of the Institute of Physics
Johns Hopkins University faculty
Members of the Chinese Academy of Sciences
Peking University alumni
Academic staff of Peking University
Physicists from Zhejiang
Zhejiang University alumni
Presidents of Southern University of Science and Technology